Nikolskoye is a rural locality (a selo) in Gafuriysky Selsoviet, Buzdyaksky District, Bashkortostan, Russia. The population was 270 as of 2010. There are 2 streets.

Geography 
Nikolskoye is located 16 km south of Buzdyak (the district's administrative centre) by road. Novokilimovo is the nearest rural locality.

References 

Rural localities in Buzdyaksky District